Valvata saulcyi is a species of gastropods belonging to the family Valvatidae. It is found in freshwater habitats of the Levant and Sicily.

The IUCN rates the conservation status of this species as least concern.

References

Valvatidae